In mathematics, a Beatty sequence (or homogeneous Beatty sequence) is the sequence of integers found by taking the floor of the positive multiples of a positive irrational number. Beatty sequences are named after Samuel Beatty, who wrote about them in 1926.

Rayleigh's theorem, named after Lord Rayleigh, states that the complement of a Beatty sequence, consisting of the positive integers that are not in the sequence, is itself a Beatty sequence generated by a different irrational number.

Beatty sequences can also be used to generate Sturmian words.

Definition
Any irrational number  that is greater than one generates the Beatty sequence

The two irrational numbers  and  naturally satisfy the equation .
The two Beatty sequences  and  that they generate form a pair of complementary Beatty sequences. Here, "complementary" means that every positive integer belongs to exactly one of these two sequences.

Examples
In this case, the sequence , known as the lower Wythoff sequence, is

and the complementary sequence , the upper Wythoff sequence, is

These sequences define the optimal strategy for Wythoff's game, and are used in the definition of the Wythoff array.

As another example, for the square root of 2, . In this case, the sequences are 

Any number in the first sequence is absent in the second, and vice versa.

History 

Beatty sequences got their name from the problem posed in The American Mathematical Monthly by Samuel Beatty in 1926. It is probably one of the most often cited problems ever posed in the Monthly. However, even earlier, in 1894 such sequences were briefly mentioned by Lord Rayleigh in the second edition of his book The Theory of Sound.

Rayleigh theorem
Rayleigh's theorem (also known as Beatty's theorem) states that given an irrational number  there exists  so that the Beatty sequences  and  partition the set of positive integers: each positive integer belongs to exactly one of the two sequences.

First proof
Given  let . We shall do so by considering the ordinal positions occupied by all the fractions  and  when they are jointly listed in nondecreasing order for positive integers j and k.

To see that no two of the numbers can occupy the same position (as a single number), suppose to the contrary that  for some j and k. Then  = , a rational number, but also,  not a rational number. Therefore, no two of the numbers occupy the same position.

The equation  implies

Conclusion: every positive integer (that is, every position in the list) is of the form  or of the form , but not both. The converse statement is also true: if p and q are two real numbers such that every positive integer occurs precisely once in the above list, then p and q are irrational and the sum of their reciprocals is 1.

Second proof
Collisions: Suppose that, contrary to the theorem, there are integers j > 0 and k and m such that

This is equivalent to the inequalities

For non-zero j, the irrationality of r and s is incompatible with equality, so

which leads to

Adding these together and using the hypothesis, we get

which is impossible (one cannot have an integer between two adjacent integers). Thus the supposition must be false.

Anti-collisions: Suppose that, contrary to the theorem, there are integers j > 0 and k and m such that

Since j + 1 is non-zero and r and s are irrational, we can exclude equality, so

Then we get

Adding corresponding inequalities, we get

which is also impossible. Thus the supposition is false.

Properties
A number  belongs to the Beatty sequence  if and only if

where  denotes the fractional part of  i.e., .

Proof:

 
 
 

Furthermore, .

Proof:

Relation with Sturmian sequences
The first difference

of the Beatty sequence associated with the irrational number  is a characteristic Sturmian word over the alphabet .

Generalizations 

If slightly modified, the Rayleigh's theorem can be generalized to positive real numbers (not necessarily irrational) and negative integers as well: if positive real numbers  and  satisfy , the sequences  and  form a partition of integers.

The Lambek–Moser theorem generalizes the Rayleigh theorem and shows that more general pairs of sequences defined from an integer function and its inverse have the same property of partitioning the integers.

Uspensky's theorem states that, if  are positive real numbers such that  contains all positive integers exactly once, then  That is, there is no equivalent of Rayleigh's theorem for three or more Beatty sequences.

References

Further reading
 
  Includes many references.

External links
 
 Alexander Bogomolny, Beatty Sequences, Cut-the-knot

Integer sequences
Theorems in number theory 
Diophantine approximation
Combinatorics on words
Articles containing proofs